Chang Teh-ming (born 1938) is a Taiwanese politician.

Chang was born in present-day Taoyuan, Taiwan, and attended National Taiwan University. Considered a political moderate, he was active in the tangwai movement as a member of the Formosa faction. This confederation lent its name to the Formosa Magazine and later sparked the Kaohsiung Incident of 1979. He helped represent the activists who became known as the Kaohsiung Eight in court. In 1980, Chang won election to the Legislative Yuan. As a legislator, he visited the United States in July 1982, and was listed as one of the recipients of an open letter presented jointly by the World Federation of Taiwanese Associations and the Taiwanese Association of America. The letter was additionally addressed to Huang Huang-hsiung, Kang Ning-hsiang, and You Ching, reminding the delegation of government officials to pursue Taiwanese self-determination. Chang lost reelection in December 1983, and launched a successful campaign for Taipei City Council in 1985. While campaigning, Chang charged Cheng Nan-jung with libel. Chang later served on the Central Election Commission.

References

1938 births
Living people
Members of the 1st Legislative Yuan in Taiwan
Taoyuan City Members of the Legislative Yuan
Miaoli County Members of the Legislative Yuan
Hsinchu County Members of the Legislative Yuan
20th-century Taiwanese lawyers
National Taiwan University alumni
Taipei City Councilors